A Japanese slipper is a drink made from Midori, Cointreau, and lemon juice. It was created in 1984 by Jean-Paul Bourguignon at Mietta's Restaurant in Melbourne.

History

The Japanese Slipper appears in literature as early as 

The bulletin: Issues 5617–5625 in 1988

"you might care for one of the other current favorites — a Toblerone, a Japanese Slipper, or a Mind Eraser. ... Bailey's, Grand Marnier) or a Melon Bullet (Midori, Mainstay, Cointreau, lemon juice)"

Preparation
Place a cherry into a cocktail glass. Place crushed ice into cocktail shaker, add Midori, then the Cointreau and lemon juice. Shake well and strain into the chilled cocktail glass and serve. Garnish with a slice of honeydew melon.

A variation can be made by replacing the Cointreau with vodka.

References

Cocktails with fruit liqueur
Melon drinks
Australian cuisine
Australian alcoholic drinks